Pseudopanax (Latin for "false ginseng") is a small genus of 12–20 species of evergreen plants, the majority of which are endemic to New Zealand. Flowers of the genus occur in terminal umbels.

Taxonomy
A 2000 molecular study established that several species within the genus were only distantly related to the core group of New Zealand species related the type species P. crassifolius. They were removed to the genus Raukaua.

Distribution and habitat
Pseudopanax occur in forest or scrub environments. The genus contains some remarkable small trees with distinctly different juvenile and adult forms, such as Pseudopanax crassifolius and Pseudopanax ferox (commonly referred to as 'lancewood' and 'toothed lancewood', respectively). Pseudopanax arboreus (common name "five-finger") is a very common small tree in New Zealand native forests. Pseudopanax simplex occurs on the North Island south of the Waihou River; in Westland and other South Island forests; as well as on Stewart Island.

Cultivation
Many of the species are popular in New Zealand gardens, but are rather rare in cultivation elsewhere, requiring mild, moist conditions similar to those in New Zealand, without extremes of temperature in winter and summer. They reportedly grow well in Southern California and warmer parts of Great Britain. A number of cultivars have been developed, mostly of Pseudopanax lessonii. These include 'Gold Splash', which has yellow variegated leaves, and 'Nigra' which has dark purple-brown foliage. A National Trust listed specimen of Pseudopanax crassifolius exists on the Alton property at Mount Macedon, Victoria, Australia, which is 21 metres high and has an 11.5 m spread. Its age is estimated at 100 years.

Host plant
In New Zealand various species in this genus have been shown to be the host plant for the larvae of Scolopterus penicillatus, a common endemic weevil. The larvae develop in recently dead bark.

References
 C. Michael Hogan. 2009. Crown Fern: Blechnum discolor, Globaltwitcher.com, ed. N. Stromberg
 John Tenison Salmon, Jason Carter and Geoff Walker. 1986. The native trees of New Zealand, Published by Reed Methuen, 384 pp ,

Line notes

 
Apiales genera